Darekasa railway station (station code DKS) is a railway station located in Maharashtra, India. It is connected with Mumbai–Howrah rail zone in South East Central Railway zone. It is situated near Amgaon taluka, in the Darekasa village.

References 

Railway stations in Gondia district